NCEA may refer to:

 National Certificate of Educational Achievement, New Zealand's main secondary school qualification
 National Council for Educational Awards, Ireland
 National Catholic Educational Association, United States
 National Collegiate Equestrian Association, United States